Jacob of Mies (1372 – 9 August 1429) was a Czech reformer from the Kingdom of Bohemia and colleague of Jan Hus.

Life 
Jacob was born in 1372 in Stříbro (called Mies in German and Misa in Latin) near Pilsen in Bohemia (present-day Czech Republic). He studied at the University of Prague, receiving both bachelor's and the master's degrees in theology, and became pastor of the Church of St. Michael and an outspoken supporter of Jan Hus. In 1410 he took part in the disputations regarding John Wycliffe, defending the latter against archiepiscopal condemnation. His study of Scripture and the Fathers led him to believe that withholding of the chalice in the administration of Holy Communion to the laity was an arbitrary measure of the Catholic Church. 

In 1414, he propounded and defended his views in a public disputation; and when Hus, at that time in jail at Konstanz, accepted them, he began to administer the chalice to his parishioners, in spite of the remonstrances of the bishop and the university. His example was quickly followed by other pastors in Prague. The Fathers of the Council of Constance (1415) issued a decree, explaining that reception of Holy Communion under both kinds was not necessary for salvation, though such reception in and of itself was not evil.  What was at stake was not the inherent good or evil of the practice, but the practical implications such as irreverence toward, and misunderstandings about, Holy Communion. 

Though Jacob would by no means submit, he was not removed from his office, perhaps because in other points, as, for instance, in the doctrine of purgatory, he agreed with the Catholic Church.  During the last decade of his life Jacob was regarded as one of the foremost of the Utraquist theologians. He died in Prague on 9 August 1429.

References
(Originally by Johann Loserth – from the New Schaff-Herzog Encyclopedia of Religious Knowledge)

Bibliography 
E. H. Gillett, Life and Times of John Huss, i., chap. xviii., ii. chap. iii., Philadelphia, 1861; KL, ii, 1315; 
Neander, Christian Church, v. 297, 331, 337, 338, 367;
Dvě staročeská utrakvistická díla Jakoubka ze Stříbra. K vydání připravili Mirek Čejka a Helena Krmíčková (= Opera Universitatis Masarykianae Brunensis, Facultas Philosophica, 379). Brno (Masarykova univerzita) 2009, 140 pp.  [The book presents two hitherto unedited Old Czech Utraquist works by Jacob of Mies: O Boží krvi (On God's Blood) and Zpráva, jak Sněm konstantský o svátosti večeře Kristovy nařídil (Account on the Council of Constance's decision about Christ's supper).]

Attribution

Czech theologians
14th-century births
1429 deaths
Hussite people
People from Stříbro
Academic staff of Charles University